The 7 Lives of Lea is a French supernatural drama streaming television series created by Charlotte Sanson, adapted from the novel Les 7 Vies de Léo Belami by Nataël Trapp.

The show is distributed internationally by Netflix.

Synopsis
In June 2021, while at an outdoor party by a river, teenage Léa stumbles upon a dead body. She wakes up the next day, thirty years in the past (to the day), inside the body of a young man named Ismaël. The following day, she awakes back in her own body and realizes it was Ismaël's body she found by the river. The process repeats each night for a total of seven days, with Léa inhabiting the body of seven different people on consecutive days in June 1991, all of whom are in some way connected to Ismaël during the final week of his life. Léa tries to prevent Ismaël's death.

Cast and characters
 Raïka Hazanavicius as Léa
 Khalil Ben Gharbia as Ismaël
 Marguerite Thiam Donnadieu as Karine (young)
 Maïra Schmitt as Romane
 Théo Fernandez as Stéphane (young)
 Rebecca Williams as Sandra
 Anne Azoulay as Patricia
 Alexander Ferrario as Pierre-Yves (young)
 Mélanie Doutey as Karine (adult)
 Samuel Benchetrit as Stéphane (adult)
 Anouar H. Smaine as Monsieur Ibrahim

References

External links
 
 
 

2022 French television series debuts
French fantasy television series
French-language Netflix original programming
Television shows set in France
2020s mystery television series